Prince Charming Regal Carousel (formerly Cinderella's Golden Carousel) is a carousel in the Magic Kingdom at Walt Disney World Resort.  Similar attractions under varying names can be found at two other Disney Parks, including Tokyo Disneyland and Hong Kong Disneyland.  It plays organ-based versions of Disney music during the two-minute ride period. Hand-painted scenes from Cinderella can be seen on the top; hence the name "Prince Charming".

Magic Kingdom version
The carousel was originally built by The Philadelphia Toboggan Company in 1917. It was originally known as "The Liberty Carousel", (PTC #46) and delivered to Belle Isle Park in Detroit, Michigan. Liberty originally had a 60-foot platform, 72 wooden horses, four chariots and sleighs, and seated 99 passengers, five abreast. It was moved to Olympic Park in Irvington, New Jersey, and in 1967 the Walt Disney Company purchased it.

Arrow Development, in which Disney had purchased a 1/3 interest in 1960 and which had restored the King Arthur Carousel for Disneyland, produced new engineering drawings for the mechanism and horses. It was shipped to California, where the horses were stripped and each given a unique design. Molds were made of 18 horses to make fiberglass copies for a new Disney carousel being built for Tokyo Disneyland and also to serve as temporary stand-ins when original wood horses are taken down for repairs. Disney also added a 23 karat gold leaf, silver, and bronze to each of the horses and added scenes from Cinderella's story. The carousel was in place when the Magic Kingdom in Orlando, Florida, opened in 1971.

While it was extensively refurbished and repainted in 1967 to match the Cinderella theme, maidens from the original design can still be seen on the top. All ninety horses are painted white because white horses are typically associated with heroes. All of the original horses were carved from maple. One chariot that was originally installed on "The Liberty" was lost during the refurbishment, but was rediscovered and installed in 1997.

While the carousel was being installed at the Magic Kingdom, Roy Disney noticed that the placement was off center with the Cinderella Castle breezeway, and it was moved eight inches so it would be center.

Cinderella's Horse
There are conflicting stories regarding whether one of the horses is "Cinderella's Horse". The horse in question is in the second rank, and is the only one that has a golden bow on its tail.

Cast Members have referred to it as Cinderella's as well as in various Disney publications.  Cinderella has been depicted as riding a horse in various pieces of collectable sculpture and artwork, such as a 2001 Limited Edition lithograph.

However, in an interview with Isle Voght, a park employee responsible for restoring the carousel along with John Hench, she gives her own reasons for doubting the veracity of the Cinderella's Horse story, namely that Cinderella would not have one on an inner row, and that it would be decorated much more elaborately than the others. Also, she states that Cinderella never rode one in the film.

The Disney Imagineers did not include the story of Cinderella's horse in the 2010 rewriting of the carousel backstory.

Name change
On June 1, 2010, the name was changed from Cinderella's Golden Carousel to Prince Charming Regal Carrousel.
The name change helps tell the rest of the Cinderella story that inspired the carousel. The official story as published on Disney Parks Blog is:

Tokyo Disneyland version
In Tokyo, the attraction is known as the Castle Carrousel. It features 72 white horses, each uniquely adorned. The carousel plays calliope music, but it does not have a genuine band organ. The carousel's make and origins are unknown.

Hong Kong Disneyland version
The carousel was built by Chance Rides. It came with four rows of Bradley and Kaye horses and Columbia chariots.

In popular culture
In the Mickey Mouse episode "Potatoland", Mickey and Donald build a theme park called Potatoland to fulfill Goofy's lifelong dream to go to the park, even though it never existed. One of the attractions featured was a low-budget carousel, similar to the carousels at Disney theme parks, with Mickey playing the organ, while Donald cranked the ride.

Incidents

See also

 King Arthur Carrousel
 Le Carrousel de Lancelot

References

External links
 Information about name change at AllEars.Net
The carousel was incorporated into an original painting and limited edition print offering by Randy Souders entitled "Cinderella's Golden Carrousel" created for the first Official Disneyana Convention held at Walt Disney World in 1992.

Amusement rides introduced in 1971
Amusement rides introduced in 1985
Amusement rides introduced in 2005
Walt Disney Parks and Resorts attractions
Magic Kingdom
Tokyo Disneyland
Hong Kong Disneyland
Cinderella (franchise)
Fantasyland
Amusement rides introduced in 1917
Philadelphia Toboggan Coasters carousels